The Manhattan Community Board 3 is a New York City community board encompassing the Manhattan neighborhoods of Alphabet City, the East Village, the Lower East Side, Two Bridges, and a large portion of Chinatown. It is delimited by the East River on the east, the Brooklyn Bridge on the south, Pearl Street, Baxter Street, Canal Street, Bowery and Fourth Avenue on the west, as well as by the 14th Street on the north.

Its current chair is Paul Rangel, and its district manager Susan Stetzer.
Like all community boards in New York City, its members are unelected political appointees.

Demographics

As of the United States Census, 2010, Community Board 3 has a population of 163,277, down from 164,407 in 2000 but up from 161,617 in 1990. Of them (as of 2010), 52,898 (32.4%) are White non-Hispanic, 11,294 (6.9%) are African-American, 55,180 (33.8%) Asian or Pacific Islander, 241 (0.1%) American Indian or Native Alaskan, 434 (0.3%) of some other race, 3,036 (1.9%) of two or more race, 40,194 (24.6%) of Hispanic origins. 

The racial make-up as of the 2000 census was 46,396 (28.2%) White non-Hispanic, 11,633 (7.1%) African-American, 57,871 (35.2%) Asian or Pacific Islander, 240 (0.1%) American Indian or Native Alaskan, 997 (0.4%) of some other race, 3,475 (2.1%) of two or more race, 44,195 (26.9%) of Hispanic origins. 

49.6% of the population benefit from public assistance as of 2009, up from 23.4 in 2000.

References

External links
Official site of the Community Board
Manhattan Community District 3 Profile

Community boards of Manhattan